Henry Seldon Pratt was an American football and basketball coach.  He served as the head football coach at the University of Cincinnati for one season in 1901, compiling a record of 1–4–1.  Pratt was also the head basketball coach at Cincinnati during the same academic year, 1901–02, tallying a mark of 5–4.

Head coaching record

Football

References

Year of birth missing
Year of death missing
Cincinnati Bearcats football coaches
Cincinnati Bearcats men's basketball coaches